Veterinary anesthesia is anesthesia performed on non-human animals by a veterinarian or a Registered Veterinary Technician.  Anesthesia is used for a wider range of circumstances in animals than in people, due to animals' inability to cooperate with certain diagnostic or therapeutic procedures.  Veterinary anesthesia includes anesthesia of the major species: dogs, cats, horses, cattle, sheep, goats, and pigs, as well as all other animals requiring veterinary care such as birds, pocket pets, and wildlife.

Specialization in anesthesia
In North America, the American College of Veterinary Anesthesia and Analgesia is one of 22 specialty organizations recognized by the American Veterinary Medical Association.  The ACVAA was recognized by the AVMA in 1975, despite attempts by the AVMA to include anesthesia as a subspecialty of surgery or medicine.  As of 2016, there are more than 250 diplomates of the ACVAA.  To become an ACVAA board-certified Diplomate, veterinarians must have at least one year of clinical practice experience followed by three years of anesthesia residency training under the supervision of ACVAA Diplomates, have accepted for publication a scientific peer-reviewed research article, and passed both a written and clinical competency examination.

In Europe, the European College of Veterinary Anaesthesia and Analgesia (ECVAA) is one of 23 specialty organizations recognized by the European Board of Veterinary Specialisation. As of February 2014, there are 147 ECVA Diplomates.

Anesthesia technicians
Anesthesia which is supervised by a qualified technician is safer than anesthesia without a technician.  In most private veterinary practices, the technician administers and monitors anesthesia with supervision from the attending veterinarian.  In many academic institutions, anesthesia technicians are involved in working with and teaching veterinary students as well as supervising anesthetized cases.  The Academy of Veterinary Technicians in Anesthesia and Analgesia  is a provisional specialty academy of the North American Veterinary Technician Association and is responsible for licensing technicians as being specialized in anesthesia.  For a technician to become specialized, they must be a licensed technician in their state, accumulate 6000 hours of work in veterinary medicine (at least 75% of which must be in anesthesia), 40 hours of continuing education related to anesthesia, demonstrate proficiency in anesthesia skills, and pass a comprehensive written examination.

Application in animals
Anesthesia is required for many surgical procedures which require the patient to be immobile, unaware, and without pain. Furthermore, anesthesia aims to minimize the surgical stress response. In addition, certain diagnostic procedures require anesthesia, notably stomach or airway endoscopy, bone marrow sampling, and occasionally ultrasound.  Aggressive animals may require anesthesia in order to handle and perform a physical exam or obtain blood for testing.  Exotic animals frequently require anesthesia for simple procedures (such as taking a radiograph or catheter placement) due to lack of domesticity.  Animals may require anesthesia for therapeutic procedures, such as urinary catheterization to relieve obstruction, injection into a mass, or removing fluid from the eye to treat glaucoma.

In addition to anesthesia, analgesia is often managed by anesthesiologists or is included in the considerations for anesthesia.

Techniques

Small animals

Cats and dogs are frequently anesthetized for surgical procedures.  Small animals are most often placed under general anesthesia due to the types of procedures typically performed, the small size of the patient, their suitability to general anesthesia, and the greater degree of control.  A balanced anesthesia protocol can be used whereby different drugs with different effects are used so that a high dose of just one drug can be avoided.  For example, combining a sedative and an opioid will permit less inhalant anesthesia to be used, improving cardiovascular stability. A one-year study in a teaching hospital shows that dogs and cats typically experience a 1 in 9 chance of anesthetic complications, with a 1 in 233 risk of death. A larger-scale study states the risk of death in healthy dogs and cats as 1 in 1849 and 1 in 895 respectively. For sick dogs and cats, it was 1 in 75 and 1 in 71 respectively. For rabbits, the risk was 1 in 137 and 1 in 14 respectively for the healthy and sick groups.

Horses and ruminants
Many procedures can be performed on the standing horse with heavy sedation alone.  Some procedures may require general anesthesia due to the location of surgery (for example, castration).  Other procedures in horses require general anesthesia using an inhalant anesthetic.  Horses, due to their complex physiology as performance animals, suffer a number of difficulties that can complicate anesthesia.  This results in horses having a higher risk of perioperative fatality - approximately 1 in 400. The number of complications related to fractures or myopathies are approximately 32%

Most procedures in ruminants can be performed standing under sedation and/or local anesthesia.  This strategy is manageable due to the types of procedures being performed, the larger size of the patient, the relative difficulty of general anesthesia, and the cost of the procedure versus the product value of the animal.

Exotic pets

Anesthesia of exotic animals (guinea pigs, rabbits, birds) is challenging and the higher peri-anesthetic mortality in these species compared to dogs and cats, attests to this fact. These animals are challenging to anesthetize for a number of reasons: very little research has been carried out on safe and effective drug doses for specific species; exotic pets often 'hide' the fact that they are sick and by the time owners realize how sick the pet is the course of the disease is far advanced; the unique anatomy and physiology of exotic pets poses challenges for anesthetic management. For example, the anatomy of the respiratory system of birds, guinea pigs, and reptiles makes it difficult to induce and maintain anesthesia solely with inhalation agents such as isoflurane and sevoflurane. Injectable drugs such as sedatives or tranquilizers are often used in these patients to facilitate induction and maintenance of anesthesia.

Anesthetic agents
Most anesthetic agents used in human medicine are used in veterinary medicine.  Alpha-2 receptor agonist drugs such as xylazine, romifidine, detomidine, and medetomidine, are used frequently in veterinary species (particularly large animal), but are rarely used in people.  Guaifenesin is used as a muscle relaxant prior to anesthesia induction in some animals.  Propofol is commonly used in small animal anesthesia, however it is rarely used in large animals due to the cost. 'Propoclear' is also commonly used in smaller branches of small animal surgery as it has a longer shelf life once opened than propofol whilst essentially having the same properties.  Butorphanol is rarely used in people but is commonly used in all species.  Ketamine, used in children for anesthesia, is used extensively in many species to induce anesthesia or cause heavy sedation.  Expensive agents, such as etomidate and desflurane are rarely used outside of university hospitals.  Different species have different responses to drugs.  For example, horses may experience mania with morphine whereas dogs typically become sedated.  Rabbits and guinea pigs are well sedated with midazolam, which can occasionally excite dogs and cats. Tricaine-S/Aqualife TMS (MS-222) is commonly used to anesthetize aquatic animals, including fish, amphibians, and other aquatic, cold-blooded animals.

See also
 American College of Veterinary Anesthesia and Analgesia
 European College of Veterinary Anaesthesia and Analgesia
 Veterinary specialties
 Tranquilizer gun (Anesthetic dart gun)

References

External links
 American College of Veterinary Anesthesiologists
 American Board of Veterinary Specialties
 North American Veterinary Technician Association
 Feline Anesthesia in the New Millennium World Small Animal Congress 2001

Anesthesia
Veterinary medicine